The Back Dorm Boys were a Chinese duo who gained fame in 2005 for their lip sync videos to songs by the Backstreet Boys and other pop stars.  Their videos, captured on a low quality web cam in their college dorm room, have been viewed by Internet users within China and around the world.  Many of their videos can be seen on YouTube, giving them YouTube fame. The two, Wei Wei and Huang Yixin, were sculpture majors at the Guangzhou Academy of Fine Arts.

The Dormitory Boys, a blog of note on Blogger, which some believe is not maintained by the Back Dorm Boys, but written by a ghostwriter, took requests, asking fans to recommend a song they should lip sync to. In January 2006, a poll was conducted from songs picked from 427 requests received 2005, December. The Black Eyed Peas' song "My Humps" won the poll, but the Back Dorm Boys lip synced to the song "Don't Lie" by the Black Eyed Peas instead, which was a huge hit on YouTube as well as their host country.

The Back Dorm Boys have produced and starred in various dramas and films, including a Chinese sitcom-drama called Nonstop (青春进行时) and a comedy film, Almost Perfect (2008).

Members

As many fans do not know the real names of the Back Dorm Boys, Wei Wei is often called simply "the big one" and Huang Yi Xin "the small one". In most videos, Wei Wei is seated on the viewer's right and Huang Yi Xin on the left.  Huang Yi Xin has a cast on his left arm in some early videos from when he got hurt playing basketball.

A third "dorm boy", Xiao Jing, is in the background of most of the videos.  He is often seen playing Counter-Strike while Wei and Huang are performing.  His back is usually turned to the camera and his face is only rarely seen. He does, however, occasionally play a role in the videos.  In the video for the Trio song "Da Da Da", Xiao Jing gets up from his chair to hold a cardboard soccer ball in the air for Huang Yi Xin to head and kick. However, Xiao Jing did not appear in the video for 'Radio In My Head'.

The Back Dorm Boys graduated from the Guangzhou Arts Institute in June 2006.

Career history
The Back Dorm Boys initially began making videos to show to their friends. They took their inspiration from a funny 10-second lip sync video that they watched, creating a video of themselves lip-syncing to an entire song. They completed their first video in March 2005, after much trial and error, uploading the finished video to the local network at their college.  The other students liked it so much that they helped to spread the video more widely.

While still at school, the Back Dorm Boys were signed as spokespeople for Motorola cellphones in China and eventually become host of Motorola's online lip-sync contests.  They also signed a contract with Sina.com, one of the largest Chinese Internet portals as bloggers and podcasters. The Back Dorm Boys maintain a Chinese-language blog through Sina.com. In 2006, they received "The Best Podcaster Award" from Sina.com.

In February 2006, a few months before they graduated, the Back Dorm Boys signed a five-year contract with Taihe Rye Music, a talent management company in Beijing, to continue making lip-sync videos as well as to appear in commercials for major brands such as Pepsi. They went to Beijing to build their own Studio Video and Multimedia Arts. They also began studying singing, dancing, and stage arts with Taihe Rye.

The Back Dorm Boys filmed a lip-sync video, "The Perfect Day", as a pilot project for their new studio. They also released their first original single, "O Yi O Yi A".  This single was accompanied by both a professional music video and a lip sync version showing the Back Dorm Boys giving their own song their usual treatment.  They are also known for making their own film in their new studio, directed by Huang Dao, in late 2006. 

The group has known to have made use of their art school education to help them prepare the composition, visual effects, and lighting in their videos.

The Back Dorm Boys phenomenon has resulted in an Internet meme and spawned a variety of parodies and imitations, including attempts by non-speakers to lip-sync to Chinese lyrics of songs used in their videos.  The Back Dorm Boys received mainstream media attention in the United States through The Ellen DeGeneres Show.

The group released their last album together in 2010 before breaking up a year later due to their expiration of a 5 year record deal with Taihe Rye Music. Since then, Huang has continued his solo career and eventually making a comeback on Your Face Sounds Familiar and has been a successful actor, director and singer. He has been married and has a child. Wei experienced ups and downs as an actor and before finding success as an arts studio owner with acting as a secondary job.

Blogs

Notes and references

External links
 后舍男生的BLOG Official Chinese Back Dorm Boys blog
 Sina BDB site Official Chinese Back Dorm Boys site
 Back Dorm Boys showcase Several downloadable wmv videos
 What Tian Has Learned Basic information and links for videos (mov)
 Back Dorm Boys Reviews Another links for their lip sync, videos, bloopers, and real life video.

Chinese Internet celebrities
Music YouTubers
Internet memes introduced in the 2000s